Aprominta syriacella is a moth in the family Autostichidae. It was described by Ragonot in 1895. It is found in Syria and Turkey (the Taurus Mountains).

References

Moths described in 1895
Aprominta
Moths of the Middle East